Werner Enke is a German film actor and screenwriter.

Selected filmography
 A Degree of Murder (dir. Volker Schlöndorff, 1967)
  (dir. Franz-Josef Spieker, 1968)
 Go for It, Baby (dir. May Spils, 1968)
 Don't Fumble, Darling (dir. May Spils, 1970)
  (dir. May Spils, 1974)
  (dir. May Spils, 1979)
  (dir. May Spils, 1983)

References

Bibliography
 Hake, Sabine. German National Cinema. Routledge, 2013.

External links

1941 births
Living people
German male film actors
Male actors from Berlin